John Everitt Frost,  (16 July 1918 – 16 June 1942) was a South African fighter ace during the Second World War. He was the highest-scoring member of a South African Air Force squadron during the war, credited with the destruction of 15 Axis aircraft. South African pilots with higher numbers of kills, such as Pat Pattle and Adolph "Sailor" Malan, were members of the British Royal Air Force.

War time service
Frost joined the South African Air Force (SAAF) in 1936, at the age of 18. By 1940 he had achieved the rank of captain, and was a member of No. 3 Squadron.

East African Campaign
In early 1941, the unit—flying Hawker Hurricanes—was dispatched to combat Italian forces during the East African Campaign. On 22 February 1941, Frost destroyed four Fiat CR.42 fighters, an action for which he was awarded the Distinguished Flying Cross.

On 15 March 1941, Frost was shot down by anti-aircraft fire while strafing Diredawa airfield. His wingman, Lieutenant Bob Kershaw landed his aircraft in a nearby field, while other 3 Sqn pilots fired on Italian infantry attempting to capture the pair. Kershaw escaped in his aircraft with Frost sitting on his lap, an action for which Kershaw was awarded the Distinguished Service Order.

The campaign ended effectively in November 1941 with the final defeat of the Italian Forces in East Africa. The squadron returned to South Africa and was disbanded.

North African Campaign
Frost, promoted to major, was appointed commander of No. 5 Squadron, flying P-40 Kittyhawks. From March 1942 the squadron participated in the North African Campaign, with the Desert Air Force. No. 5 Squadron joined No. 2 and No. 4 Squadrons in No. 233 Wing; the main role of the SAAF fighters at the time was highly dangerous bomber escort missions, supporting No. 3 (Bomber) Wing SAAF.

The squadron was assigned to the Sollum-Mersa Matruh sector. On 11 May, Frost and his wingman Lieutenant Ken Whyte shared the destruction of a lone Heinkel He 111 bomber attacking a convoy bound for Malta. Whyte described the action: "I remember our first combat together. While on a shipping patrol we were vectored on to a He 111. Jack made his favourite three-quarter attack which had brought him success in Abyssinia. I attacked from the rear. We each claimed half a share in its destruction." On 16 May, Frost destroyed a Junkers Ju 88, for his ninth victory, but was hit by cannon fire damaging his port elevator.

On 28 May 1942, he was involved in a shared victory over a Messerschmitt Bf 109, his first. (The pilot, Feldwebel Willi Langer was killed.) At this stage, Frost's total tally stood at 15 Axis aircraft destroyed.

Frost was appointed commander of No. 233 Wing on 31 May, but his replacement at 5 Squadron, Andrew Duncan, was shot down and killed by Oberleutnant Otto Schulz.

On 16 June, whilst escorting Douglas Bostons, Frost and other P-40 pilots encountered Bf 109s from Jagdgeschwader 27, near Bir Hakeim, Egypt. Rod Hojem, one of the South African pilots involved in this combat commented: "There was one hell of a dogfight, and after it was over I can clearly remember Jack calling up the squadron on the R/T, "Form up chaps I am heading North", and that was the last we heard of him." Frost's aircraft and remains have never been found, and his fate remains unclear. Some sources suggest that Frost fell victim to one of the most prominent German aces, Hans-Joachim Marseille, who scored six of his 158 victories that same day. It has also been suggested that another German Experte, Günter Steinhausen (who claimed four kills that day) may have shot down Frost.

See also
List of people who disappeared
List of World War II aces from South Africa

References
Footnotes

Bibliography
 D. P. Tidy, "South African Air Aces of World War II", Military History Journal v1 n6. June 1970. (The South African Military History Society)
 Aces of the Luftwaffe, "Günther Steinhausen, Leutnant" (2007).
 Thomas, Andrew. Tomahawk and Kittyhawk Aces of the RAF and Commonwealth. Oxford, England: Osprey Publications, 2005 
 Wübbe, Walter. Hauptmann Hans Joachim Marseille Ein Jagdfliegerschicksal in Daten, Bildern und Dokumenten (in German). Schnellbach, Germany: Verlag Siegfried Bublies, 2001. .

External links
Jack frost at acesofww2.com

1918 births
1940s missing person cases
1942 deaths
Aviators killed by being shot down
Missing in action of World War II
Missing person cases in Egypt
People from Queenstown, South Africa
Recipients of the Distinguished Flying Cross (United Kingdom)
South African Air Force officers
South African Air Force personnel of World War II
South African military personnel killed in World War II
South African people of British descent
South African World War II flying aces
White South African people